Allium sharsmithiae, called the Mount Hamilton onion or Helen Sharsmith's onion, is a rare species of wild onion endemic to a small region in California. It is found on serpentine soils in the vicinity of Mount Hamilton, in the Diablo Range south of San Francisco Bay in Santa Clara, Alameda and Stanislaus Counties.

Description
Allium sharsmithiae produces round to egg-shaped bulbs up to 2 cm in diameter. Flowering stalk is round in cross section, not hollow, up to 20 cm tall. Flowers are urn-shaped, up to 2 cm in diameter; tepals deep reddish-purple; anthers and pollen yellow.

References

External links
Pacific Bulb Society, American Alliums Seven several color photos of several species including Allium sharsmithiae
Calphotos, Allium sharsmithiae several color photos of Allium sharsmithiae

sharsmithiae
Plants described in 1972
Endemic flora of California